The Türkentor (Turks' Gate) is a gatehouse in Munich. It is the only surviving part of the Türkenkaserne (Turk's barracks), built in 1826 for the Royal Bavarian Infantry Lifeguards Regiment. The barracks and remaining gatehouse were named after the Türkenstraße on which they were located, which was in turn named after the Türkengraben channel dug along the Kurfürstenstraße by Turkish prisoners of war during the German states' 18th century wars with the Ottoman Empire to provide a waterway as part of the North Munich Canal System (Nordmünchner Kanalsystem) linking the Munich Residenz with the Schleissheim Palace.

Between 2008 and 2010 the Türkentor was restored with 780,000 euro from the Stiftung Pinakothek der Moderne. It reopened in October 2010 and since then has housed the sculpture Large Red Sphere by the American artist Walter De Maria, which had been purchased by the Stiftung Brandhorst.

References

External links 
  Art in the Türkentor

Buildings and structures completed in 1826
Buildings and structures in Munich
Museums in Munich
Gates in Germany
1826 establishments in Bavaria